Brute Force is the third studio album by French guitarist Rémi Gallego under the musical moniker the Algorithm. The album was released on 1 April 2016 and is the only one to be released via FiXT Music.

Background
Promotional video single "Floating Point" was announced through Metal Hammer on 30 January 2016 with a remix released on the band's official blog the following month. On 9 March 2016 Metal Underground premiered the music video for "Pointers" along with the track listing for the album. Commenting on the release, Gallego stated the track was "one of my favorite [songs] so far". The same day the album was made available for pre-order on the band's website with various bundle options. Some bundles included a MIDI version of the album on a floppy disk. On 30 March 2016, two days before official release, the full album was streamed with Metal Hammer accompanied by Gallego's track-by-track analysis of the album.

Reception

Upon release, the album gained generally positive reviews from metal publications. Paulo Bodriguez of The Monolith gave the album a positive review, stating "The Algorithm...have clearly found their own unique style and sound", while referring to the floppy disk pre-orders as a "cheeky sense of self-awareness". Nicholas Senior of New Noise Magazine, when observing the progression of The Algorithm's sound, stated "we hear the band hitting a sweet spot down the middle, with an album that is equally comfortable executing really interesting electronic passages and hard synths as it is hitting the blast beats and post-Meshuggah riffs hard."

Track listing

 All song titles are stylised in lowercase.

Personnel
The Algorithm
 Rémi Gallego – synthesizer, sequencer, guitar, mixing, programming, producer

Additional musicians
 Igorrr – composition on "Deadlock"

Production
 Erica Schaub – artwork, layout

References

2016 albums
The Algorithm albums
Albums produced by Rémi Gallego
FiXT albums